Chorlton is a civil parish in Cheshire West and Chester, England.  It contains four buildings that are recorded in the National Heritage List for England as designated listed buildings.  The parish is rural, and all the listed buildings are domestic or related to farming.

Key

Buildings

References
Citations

Sources

Listed buildings in Cheshire West and Chester
Lists of listed buildings in Cheshire